Thomas Benton Allen (March 20, 1929 – December 11, 2018) was an American author and historian.  He resided in Bethesda, Maryland. He was also the father of science fiction writer Roger MacBride Allen. Allen was a contributing editor to National Geographic. Allen had co-authored numerous books with Norman Polmar. He had also written numerous mystery novels.

Publication and film
His most famous book to date was Possessed. It is a retelling of the true story of a teenage boy (whom Allen identified by the pseudonym Robbie Manheim) from Mt. Rainier, Maryland, who went through the rite of exorcism in 1949. Allen tracked down the sole survivor of the team that performed the exorcism, Father Walter Halloran, as well as a copy of the diary kept by the team leader, Father William S. Bowdern. The primary source of the documentation is the diary authored by Father Raymond J. Bishop, S.J. Father Raymond J. Bishop, S.J enlisted the assistance of the other Jesuits. It was upon this case William Peter Blatty based the events of his novel, The Exorcist. First published in hardcover in 1993, the book was reïssued as a revised paperback in 2000 to coïncide with the release of a made-for-cable film Possessed starring Timothy Dalton as Father Bowdern. Since publication of the book, Allen had been a frequent guest on talk shows, entertainment shows, and history shows that discuss exorcism in general, demonic possession, and the case his book details.

Speaking in 2013, Allen "emphasized that definitive proof that the boy known only as 'Robbie' was possessed by malevolent spirits is unattainable. Maybe he instead suffered from mental illness or sexual abuse — or fabricated the entire experience." According to Allen, Halloran also "expressed his skepticism about potential paranormal events before his death."

Criticism
Allen's Possessed has been criticized by Mark Opsasnick, who wrote that it contained questionable or inaccurate material, such as misidentifying the location as Mount Rainier, Maryland, rather than Cottage City, Maryland.

Bibliography
 Rickover: Controversy and Genius: A Biography, 1982. with Norman Polmar
 Allen, Thomas B. War Games: The Secret World of the Creators, Players, and Policy Makers Rehearsing World War III Today. New York: McGraw-Hill, 1987. 
 Allen, Thomas B., and Sam Abell. The Blue and the Gray. [Washington, D.C.]: National Geographic Society, 1992. 
 Remember Pearl Harbor: Japanese And American Survivors Tell Their Stories
 Harriet Tubman, Secret Agent: How Daring Slaves and Free Blacks Spied for the Union During the Civil War
 Allen, Thomas B., F. Clifton Berry, and Norman Polmar. War in the Gulf. Atlanta: Turner Pub, 1991. 
 Possessed: The True Story of an Exorcism, 1993.
 Allen, Thomas B., and Norman Polmar. Code-Name Downfall: The Secret Plan to Invade Japan and Why Truman Dropped the Bomb. New York: Simon & Schuster, 1995. 
 Spy Book: The Encyclopedia of Espionage, 1996. with Norman Polmar
 The Shark Almanac: A Fully Illustrated Natural History of Sharks, Skates, and Rays, 1999.
 Allen, Thomas B., and Cheryl Harness. George Washington, Spymaster: How America Outspied the British and Won the Revolutionary War. Washington, D.C.: National Geographic, 2004.  
 Dickson, Paul, and Thomas B. Allen. The Bonus Army: An American Epic. New York: Walker & Co, 2005. 
 Mr. Lincoln's High Tech War (2008) with Roger MacBride Allen
 Time Capsule: The Book of Record (2010) with Roger MacBride Allen
 Allen, Thomas B., and Norman Polmar. Ship of Gold. Annapolis, Maryland : Naval Institute Press, 2014.   Previously published in 1987 by Macmillan Publishing Company.

References

External links
 Thomas B. Allen His Homepage
 Thomas B. Allen video discussing his book Tories: Fighting for the King in America's First Civil War.
 Interview at the Pritzker Military Museum & Library
 Tories: Fighting for the King in America's First Civil War a lecture by Thomas B. Allen on his book at the Library of Congress
 

1929 births
2018 deaths
Spiritual warfare
21st-century American historians
21st-century American male writers
American male non-fiction writers